The 2019 Fairfield Challenger was a professional tennis tournament played on hard courts. It was the fifth edition of the tournament which was part of the 2019 ATP Challenger Tour. It took place in Fairfield, California, United States between 7 and 13 October 2019.

Singles main-draw entrants

Seeds

 1 Rankings are as of September 30, 2019.

Other entrants
The following players received wildcards into the singles main draw:
  Brandon Holt
  Steve Johnson
  Brandon Nakashima
  Alex Rybakov
  Zachary Svajda

The following player received entry into the singles main draw as an alternate:
  Strong Kirchheimer

The following players received entry from the qualifying draw:
  Felix Corwin
  Sem Verbeek

The following player received entry as a lucky loser:
  Dennis Novikov

Champions

Singles

 Christopher O'Connell def.  Steve Johnson 6–4, 6–4.

Doubles

  Darian King /  Peter Polansky def.  André Göransson /  Sem Verbeek 6–4, 3–6, [12–10].

References

2019 ATP Challenger Tour
October 2019 sports events in the United States
2019 in American tennis
Fairfield Challenger